The 2013 Hockey East Men's Ice Hockey Tournament was played between March 14 and March 13, 2013 at campus locations and at the TD Garden in Boston, Massachusetts. The Massachusetts–Lowell River Hawks won their first Hockey East Tournament and earned the Hockey East's automatic bid into the 2013 NCAA Division I Men's Ice Hockey Tournament.

Format
The tournament featured three rounds of play. The teams that finish below eighth in the conference are not eligible for tournament play. In the first round, the first and eighth seeds, the second and seventh seeds, the third seed and sixth seeds, and the fourth seed and fifth seeds played a best-of-three with the winner advancing to the semifinals. In the semifinals, the highest and lowest seeds and second highest and second lowest seeds play a single-elimination game, with the winner advancing to the championship game. The tournament champion receives an automatic bid to the 2013 NCAA Division I Men's Ice Hockey Tournament.

Regular season standings
Note: GP = Games played; W = Wins; L = Losses; T = Ties; PTS = Points; GF = Goals For; GA = Goals Against

Bracket

Note: * denotes overtime periods

Results

Quarterfinals

(1) Massachusetts–Lowell vs. (8) Maine

(2) Boston College vs. (7) Vermont

(3) Boston University vs. (6) Merrimack

(4) Providence vs. (5) New Hampshire

Semifinals

(1) Massachusetts–Lowell vs. (4) Providence

(2) Boston College vs. (3) Boston University

Championship

(1) Massachusetts–Lowell vs. (3) Boston University

Tournament awards

All-Tournament Team
F Danny O'Regan (Boston University)
F Evan Rodrigues (Boston University)
F Scott Wilson (Massachusetts-Lowell)
D Matt Grzelcyk (Boston University)
D Chad Ruhwedel (Massachusetts-Lowell)
G Connor Hellebuyck* (Massachusetts-Lowell)
* Tournament MVP(s)

References

External links
2013 Hockey East Men's Ice Hockey Tournament

Hockey East Men's Ice Hockey Tournament
Hockey East Men's Ice Hockey Tournament